The 1985–86 Boston Celtics season was the 40th season of the Boston Celtics in the National Basketball Association (NBA).  They finished with the best record in the league at 67–15, including a 40–1 record at home (37–1 at the Boston Garden, 3–0 at the Hartford Civic Center).  Those 40 home wins set an NBA record which would only be matched by the San Antonio Spurs in 2016. Widely regarded among the greatest teams in NBA history, their 67 total wins were one win shy of tying their franchise record of 68 wins set in 1972–73, and tied for seventh all-time for total wins by a team in a single season.

Larry Bird won his third consecutive MVP award and Bill Walton won the Sixth Man of the Year Award.  The team was anchored by the
"Big Three" frontcourt of Bird, Kevin McHale and Robert Parish, which is frequently ranked among the best frontcourts in NBA history.

In the playoffs, the Celtics swept the Chicago Bulls in three games in the First Round, then defeated the Atlanta Hawks in five games in the Semi-finals, before sweeping the Milwaukee Bucks in four games in the Conference Finals to reach the NBA Finals for a third consecutive season. In the NBA Finals, the Celtics faced off against the Houston Rockets in a rematch of the 1981 NBA Finals, which the Celtics won in six games. The Celtics would go on to win their 16th championship and the last for 22 years, defeating the Houston Rockets in six games in the NBA Finals, and had won 82 combined regular season and playoff games, a record that stood until the Chicago Bulls racked up 87 combined wins en route to a title (the 2015-16 Golden State Warriors broke that record with 88 combined wins, although they famously lost the finals).

NBA Draft
The 1985 NBA Draft took place on June 18, 1985. It was also the first NBA Draft of the "Lottery" era. The lottery was put into place so teams could not intentionally lose games to receive the number one pick.

Season Synopsis
The Celtics were coming from a 6-game NBA Finals series against their arch-rival the Los Angeles Lakers. They ended with a record 63-19 during the regular season, a league-best record, earning home court advantage throughout the playoffs.

November
They started their 1985–86 season campaign with a 109-113 OT loss to the New Jersey Nets, despite a near quadruple-double performance from Larry Bird who recorded 21 points, 12 rebounds, 10 assists and 8 steals for the Celtics. The next day, Kevin McHale's 26 points and 15 rebounds led the Celtics towards a 105-100 road win over the Cavaliers. Four days later, the Celtics defeated the visiting Bucks, 117–106, with Bird, McHale, Parish and Johnson, all scoring at least 20 points. They ended the month of November with a 2–1 record.

Regular season
 Under head coach K. C. Jones, the 1985–86 Boston Celtics finished the regular season with a record of 67–15. This team is generally considered to be the best of Larry Bird's career. In addition to longtime Celtics Kevin McHale and Robert Parish, the franchise was joined on the front line by former NBA MVP Bill Walton. Despite a career plagued by a series of serious injuries to his knees, ankles and feet, Walton would win the NBA Sixth Man of the Year Award. Walton had missed essentially the past two seasons and the Los Angeles Clippers put him on the trade bloc as his contract ran out.  The Los Angeles Lakers and the Celtics were both interested, but the Lakers wanted Walton to be cleared by their team doctor before making any trade.  The Celtics, on the other hand, were willing to trade former Finals MVP Cedric Maxwell for Walton-based solely on his word that he felt he was healthy enough to play.  Walton appeared in a career high 80 games.  The backcourt was led by the MVP of the 1979 NBA Finals, defensive stopper Dennis Johnson, and former Toronto Blue Jays baseball player, shooting guard Danny Ainge.  Off the bench, the Celtics featured former All-Star Scott Wedman and recent acquisition (from the Indiana Pacers) Jerry Sichting.

Season standings

Record vs. opponents

Game log

|- align="center" bgcolor="#ffcccc"
| 1
| October 25, 1985 
| @ New Jersey
| L 109–113 (OT)
|
|
|
| Brendan Byrne Arena
| 0–1
|- align="center" bgcolor="#ccffcc"
| 2
| October 26, 1985 
| @ Cleveland
| W 105–100
|
|
|
| Richfield Coliseum
| 1–1
|- align="center" bgcolor="#ccffcc"
| 3
| October 30, 1985 
| Milwaukee 
| W 117–106
|
|
|
| Boston Garden
| 2–1

|- align="center" bgcolor="#ccffcc"
| 4
| November 1, 19857:30p.m. EST
| Atlanta
| W 109–105
| Bird (25)
| McHale (10)
| Johnson (9)
| Boston Garden14,890
| 3–1
|- align="center" bgcolor="#ccffcc"
| 5
| November 2, 1985
| @ Washington
| W 88–73
|
|
|
| Capital Centre
| 4–1
|- align="center" bgcolor="#ccffcc"
| 6
| November 8, 1985
| Phoenix
| W 125–101
|
|
|
| Boston Garden
| 5–1
|- align="center" bgcolor="#ccffcc"
| 7
| November 9, 1985
| @ Detroit
| W 124–105
|
|
|
| Pontiac Silverdome
| 6–1
|- align="center" bgcolor="#ccffcc"
| 8
| November 13, 1985
| Indiana
| W 118–114
|
|
|
| Boston Garden
| 7–1
|- align="center" bgcolor="#ccffcc"
| 9
| November 15, 1985
| Washington
| W 118–114
|
|
|
| Boston Garden
| 8–1
|- align="center" bgcolor="#ffcccc"
| 10
| November 16, 1985
| @ Indiana
| L 109–111
|
|
|
| Market Square Arena
| 8–2
|- align="center" bgcolor="#ccffcc"
| 11
| November 20, 1985
| Utah
| W 115–106 (OT)
|
|
|
| Boston Garden
| 9–2
|- align="center" bgcolor="#ccffcc"
| 12
| November 22, 1985
| Philadelphia
| W 110–103
|
|
|
| Boston Garden
| 10–2
|- align="center" bgcolor="#ccffcc"
| 13
| November 23, 1985
| @ New York
| W 113–104
|
|
|
| Madison Square Garden
| 11–2
|- align="center" bgcolor="#ccffcc"
| 14
| November 26, 1985
| @ Philadelphia
| W 98–91
|
|
|
| The Spectrum
| 12–2
|- align="center" bgcolor="#ccffcc"
| 15
| November 27, 1985
| Detroit
| W 132–124
|
|
|
| Boston Garden
| 13–2
|- align="center" bgcolor="#ccffcc"
| 16
| November 29, 1986
| New York
| W 94–88
|
|
|
| Boston Garden
| 14–2
|- align="center" bgcolor="#ccffcc"
| 17
| November 30, 19857:30p.m. EST
| @ Atlanta
| W 102–97
| Bird (28)
| McHale (8)
| Johnson (8)
| The Omni13,101
| 15–2

|- align="center" bgcolor="#ccffcc"
| 18
| December 3, 1985
| @ Milwaukee
| W 112–109
|
|
|
| MECCA Arena
| 16–2
|- align="center" bgcolor="#ccffcc"
| 19
| December 4, 1985 
| @ New Jersey
| W 130–111
|
|
|
| Brendan Byrne Arena
| 17–2
|- align="center" bgcolor="#ffcccc"
| 20
| December 6, 1985
| Portland
| L 103–121
|
|
|
| Boston Garden
| 17–3
|- align="center" bgcolor="#ccffcc"
| 21
| December 10, 19857:30p.m. EST
| Atlanta
| W 114–110
| McHale, Parish (24)
| Parish (10)
| Johnson (9)
| Hartford Civic Center14,493
| 18–3
|- align="center" bgcolor="#ccffcc"
| 22
| December 11, 1985
| Sacramento
| W 118–101
|
|
|
| Boston Garden
| 19–3
|- align="center" bgcolor="#ffcccc"
| 23
| December 14, 1985
| @ Cleveland
| L 99–109
|
|
|
| Richfield Coliseum
| 19–4
|- align="center" bgcolor="#ccffcc"
| 24
| December 15, 1985
| Chicago
| W 109–104
|
|
|
| Boston Garden
| 20–4
|- align="center" bgcolor="#ffcccc"
| 25
| December 17, 1985
| @ Chicago
| L 108–116
|
|
|
| Chicago Stadium
| 20–5
|- align="center" bgcolor="#ccffcc"
| 26
| December 18, 1985
| Dallas
| W 137–117
|
|
|
| Boston Garden
| 21–5
|- align="center" bgcolor="#ffcccc"
| 27
| December 21, 1985
| @ Philadelphia
| L 102–108
|
|
|
| The Spectrum
| 21–6
|- align="center" bgcolor="#ffcccc"
| 28 
| December 25, 1985
| @ New York
| L 104–113 (2OT)
|
|
|
| Madison Square Garden
| 21–7
|- align="center" bgcolor="#ccffcc"
| 29
| December 28, 1985
| @ Utah
| W 110–108
|
|
|
| Salt Palace Acord Arena
| 22–7
|- align="center" bgcolor="#ccffcc"
| 30
| December 30, 1985
| @ L.A. Clippers
| W 125–103
|
|
|
| Los Angeles Memorial Sports Arena
| 23–7

|- align="center" bgcolor="#ccffcc"
| 31
| January 2, 1986 
| @ Indiana
| W 122–104
|
|
|
| Market Square Arena
| 24–7
|- align="center" bgcolor="#ccffcc"
| 32
| January 3, 1986
| New Jersey
| W 129–117
|
|
|
| Boston Garden
| 25–7
|- align="center" bgcolor="#ffcccc"
| 33
| January 7, 1986
| @ Detroit
| L 109–113
|
|
|
| Pontiac Silverdome
| 25–8
|- align="center" bgcolor="#ccffcc"
| 34
| January 8, 1986
| Cleveland
| W 126–95
|
|
|
| Boston Garden
| 26–8
|- align="center" bgcolor="#ccffcc"
| 35
| January 10, 19867:30p.m. EST
| Atlanta
| W 115–108
| Bird (29)
| Parish (15)
| Johnson (8)
| Boston Garden14,890
| 27–8
|- align="center" bgcolor="#ccffcc"
| 36
| January 15, 1986
| Denver
| W 123–100
|
|
|
| Boston Garden
| 28–8
|- align="center" bgcolor="#ccffcc"
| 37
| January 17, 1986
| @ Indiana
| W 123–105
|
|
|
| Market Square Arena
| 29–8
|- align="center" bgcolor="#ccffcc"
| 38
| January 18, 19867:30p.m. EST
| @ Atlanta
| W 125–122 (OT)
| Bird (41)
| McHale (12)
| Ainge (11)
| The Omni16,522
| 30–8
|- align="center" bgcolor="#ccffcc"
| 39
| January 22, 1986
| L.A. Lakers
| W 110–95
|
|
|
| Boston Garden
| 31–8
|- align="center" bgcolor="#ccffcc"
| 40
| January 24, 1986
| Golden State
| W 135–114
|
|
|
| Boston Garden
| 32–8
|- align="center" bgcolor="#ccffcc"
| 41
| January 26, 1986
| Philadelphia
| W 105–103
|
|
|
| Boston Garden
| 33–8
|- align="center" bgcolor="#ccffcc"
| 42
| January 30, 1986
| @ Chicago
| W 101–91
|
|
|
| Chicago Stadium
| 34–8
|- align="center" bgcolor="#ccffcc"
| 43
| January 31, 1986
| @ Washington
| W 97–88
|
|
|
| Capital Centre
| 35–8

|- align="center" bgcolor="#ccffcc"
| 44
| February 2, 1986
| Seattle
| W 114–101
|
|
|
| Boston Garden
| 36–8
|- align="center" bgcolor="#ccffcc"
| 45
| February 4, 1986
| @ Milwaukee
| W 112–93
|
|
|
| MECCA Arena
| 37–8
|- align="center" bgcolor="#ccffcc"
| 46
| February 5, 1986
| Washington
| W 103–88
|
|
|
| Boston Garden
| 38–8
|- align="center"
|colspan="9" bgcolor="#bbcaff"|All-Star Break
|- style="background:#cfc;"
|- bgcolor="#bbffbb"
|- align="center" bgcolor="#ffcccc"
| 47
| February 11, 1986
| @ Sacramento
| L 100–105
|
|
|
| ARCO Arena
| 38–9
|- align="center" bgcolor="#ccffcc"
| 48
| February 13, 1986
| @ Seattle
| W 107–98
|
|
|
| Seattle Center Coliseum
| 39–9
|- align="center" bgcolor="#ccffcc"
| 49
| February 14, 1986
| @ Portland
| W 120–119 (OT)
|
|
|
| Memorial Coliseum
| 40–9
|- align="center" bgcolor="#ccffcc"
| 50
| February 16, 1986
| @ L.A. Lakers
| W 105–99
|
|
|
| The Forum
| 41–9
|- align="center" bgcolor="#ffcccc"
| 51
| February 17, 1986
| @ Phoenix
| L 101–108
|
|
|
| Arizona Veterans Memorial Coliseum
| 41–10
|- align="center" bgcolor="#ccffcc"
| 52
| February 19, 1986
| @ Golden State
| W 115–100
|
|
|
| Oakland-Alameda County Coliseum Arena
| 42–10
|- align="center" bgcolor="#ffcccc"
| 53
| February 20, 1986
| @ Denver
| L 100–102
|
|
|
| McNichols Sports Arena
| 42–11
|- align="center" bgcolor="#ccffcc"
| 54
| February 23, 1986
| Indiana
| W 113–98
|
|
|
| Hartford Civic Center
| 43–11
|- align="center" bgcolor="#ccffcc"
| 55
| February 25, 1986
| @ New York
| W 91–74
|
|
|
| Madison Square Garden
| 44–11
|- align="center" bgcolor="#ccffcc"
| 56
| February 26, 1986
| San Antonio
| W 120–100
|
|
|
| Boston Garden
| 45–11
|- align="center" bgcolor="#ccffcc"
| 57
| February 28, 1986
| L.A. Clippers
| W 124–108
|
|
|
| Boston Garden
| 46–11

|- align="center" bgcolor="#ccffcc"
| 58
| March 2, 1986
| Detroit
| W 129–109
|
|
|
| Boston Garden
| 47–11
|- align="center" bgcolor="#ccffcc"
| 59
| March 4, 1986
| @ Chicago
| W 106–94
|
|
|
| Chicago Stadium
| 48–11
|- align="center" bgcolor="#ccffcc"
| 60
| March 5, 1986
| Chicago
| W 108–97
|
|
|
| Boston Garden
| 49–11
|- align="center" bgcolor="#ccffcc"
| 61
| March 7, 1986
| New York
| W 115–108
|
|
|
| Boston Garden
| 50–11
|- align="center" bgcolor="#ffcccc"
| 62
| March 8, 1986
| @ Washington
| L 108–110 (OT)
|
|
|
| Capital Centre
| 50–12
|- align="center" bgcolor="#ffcccc"
| 63
| March 10, 1986
| @ Dallas
| L 115–116
|
|
|
| Reunion Arena
| 50–13
|- align="center" bgcolor="#ccffcc"
| 64
| March 11, 1986
| @ Houston
| W 116–104
|
|
|
| The Summit
| 51–13
|- align="center" bgcolor="#ccffcc"
| 65
| March 13, 1986
| @ San Antonio
| W 135–119
|
|
|
| HemisFair Arena
| 52–13
|- align="center" bgcolor="#ccffcc"
| 66
| March 14, 19867:30p.m. EST
| @ Atlanta
| W 121–114
| Bird (26)
| McHale (12)
| Johnson (9)
| The Omni16,522
| 53–13
|- align="center" bgcolor="#ccffcc"
| 67
| March 16, 1986
| Philadelphia
| W 118–101
|
|
|
| Boston Garden
| 54–13
|- align="center" bgcolor="#ccffcc"
| 68
| March 18, 1986
| Cleveland
| W 126–96
|
|
|
| Hartford Civic Center
| 55–13
|- align="center" bgcolor="#ccffcc"
| 69
| March 19, 1986
| Indiana
| W 127–108
|
|
|
| Boston Garden
| 56–13
|- align="center" bgcolor="#ccffcc"
| 70
| March 21, 1986
| Chicago
| W 126–105
|
|
|
| Boston Garden
| 57–13
|- align="center" bgcolor="#ccffcc"
| 71
| March 24, 1986
| Houston
| W 114–107
|
|
|
| Boston Garden
| 58–13
|- align="center" bgcolor="#ccffcc"
| 72
| March 26, 1986
| Milwaukee
| W 121–115
|
|
|
| Boston Garden
| 59–13
|- align="center" bgcolor="#ccffcc"
| 73
| March 28, 1986
| Washington
| W 116–97
|
|
|
| Boston Garden
| 60–13
|- align="center" bgcolor="#ccffcc"
| 74
| March 30, 1986
| New Jersey
| W 122–117
|
|
|
| Boston Garden
| 61–13

|- align="center" bgcolor="#ccffcc"
| 75
| April 1, 1986
| @ Cleveland
| W 123–105
|
|
|
| Richfield Coliseum
| 62–13
|- align="center" bgcolor="#ccffcc"
| 76
| April 2, 1986
| Detroit
| W 122–106
|
|
|
| Boston Garden
| 63–13
|- align="center" bgcolor="#ccffcc"
| 77
| April 4, 1986
| New York
| W 119–98
|
|
|
| Boston Garden
| 64–13
|- align="center" bgcolor="#ffcccc"
| 78
| April 6, 1986
| @ Philadelphia
| L 94–95
|
|
|
| The Spectrum
| 64–14
|- align="center" bgcolor="#ccffcc"
| 79
| April 8, 1986
| @ Milwaukee
| W 126–114
|
|
|
| MECCA Arena
| 65–14
|- align="center" bgcolor="#ffcccc"
| 80
| April 9, 1986
| @ New Jersey
| L 98–108
|
|
|
| Brendan Byrne Arena
| 65–15
|- align="center" bgcolor="#ccffcc"
| 81
| April 11, 1986
| Cleveland
| W 117–104
|
|
|
| Boston Garden 
| 66–15
|- align="center" bgcolor="#ccffcc"
| 82
| April 13, 1986
| New Jersey
| W 135–107
|
|
|
| Boston Garden 
| 67–15

Player stats
Note: GP= Games played; REB= Rebounds; AST= Assists; STL = Steals; BLK = Blocks; PTS = Points; AVG = Average

Playoffs

|- align="center" bgcolor="#ccffcc"
| 1
| April 17, 1986
| Chicago
| W 123–104
| Larry Bird (30)
| McHale, Parish (10)
| Larry Bird (8)
| Boston Garden14,890
| 1–0
|- align="center" bgcolor="#ccffcc"
| 2
| April 20, 1986
| Chicago
| W 135–131 (2OT)
| Larry Bird (36)
| McHale, Walton (15)
| Bird, Johnson (8)
| Boston Garden14,890
| 2–0
|- align="center" bgcolor="#ccffcc"
| 3
| April 22, 1986
| @ Chicago
| W 122–104
| Kevin McHale (31)
| Bill Walton (9)
| Larry Bird (8)
| Chicago Stadium18,968
| 3–0
|-

|- align="center" bgcolor="#ccffcc"
| 1
| April 27, 19861:00p.m. EDT
| Atlanta
| W 103–91
| McHale (24)
| Bird (12)
| Johnson (14)
| Boston Garden14,890
| 1–0
|- align="center" bgcolor="#ccffcc"
| 2
| April 29, 19868:30p.m. EDT
| Atlanta
| W 119–108
| Bird (36)
| McHale (9)
| Johnson (9)
| Boston Garden14,890
| 2–0
|- align="center" bgcolor="#ccffcc"
| 3
| May 2, 19867:30p.m. EDT
| @ Atlanta
| W 111–107
| Bird (28)
| Parish (14)
| Bird (12)
| The Omni12,357
| 3–0
|- align="center" bgcolor="#ffcccc"
| 4
| May 4, 19861:00p.m. EDT
| @ Atlanta
| L 94–106
| McHale (26)
| McHale (12)
| Bird (5)
| The Omni12,357
| 3–1
|- align="center" bgcolor="#ccffcc"
| 5
| May 6, 19867:30p.m. EDT
| Atlanta
| W 132–99
| Bird (36)
| Parish (13)
| Johnson (8)
| Boston Garden14,890
| 4–1
|-

|- align="center" bgcolor="#ccffcc"
| 1
| May 13, 1986
| Milwaukee
| W 128–96
| Larry Bird (26)
| Danny Ainge (10)
| Jerry Sichting (8)
| Boston Garden14,890
| 1–0
|- align="center" bgcolor="#ccffcc"
| 2
| May 15, 1986
| Milwaukee
| W 122–111
| Larry Bird (26)
| Robert Parish (9)
| Larry Bird (9)
| Boston Garden14,890
| 2–0
|- align="center" bgcolor="#ccffcc"
| 3
| May 17, 1986
| @ Milwaukee
| W 111–107
| Kevin McHale (29)
| Larry Bird (16)
| Larry Bird (13)
| MECCA Arena11,052
| 3–0
|- align="center" bgcolor="#ccffcc"
| 4
| May 18, 1986
| @ Milwaukee
| W 111–98
| Larry Bird (30)
| Kevin McHale (11)
| Ainge, Bird (5)
| MECCA Arena11,052
| 4–0
|-

|- align="center" bgcolor="#ccffcc"
| 1
| May 26
| Houston
| W 112–100
| Robert Parish (23)
| Dennis Johnson (11)
| Larry Bird (13)
| Boston Garden14,890
| 1–0
|- align="center" bgcolor="#ccffcc"
| 2
| May 29
| Houston
| W 117–95
| Larry Bird (31)
| Larry Bird (8)
| Larry Bird (7)
| Boston Garden14,890
| 2–0
|- align="center" bgcolor="#ffcccc"
| 3
| June 1
| @ Houston
| L 104–106
| Kevin McHale (28)
| Larry Bird (15)
| Larry Bird (11)
| The Summit16,016
| 2–1
|- align="center" bgcolor="#ccffcc"
| 4
| June 3
| @ Houston
| W 106–103
| Robert Parish (22)
| Robert Parish (15)
| Larry Bird (10)
| The Summit16,016
| 3–1
|- align="center" bgcolor="#ffcccc"
| 5
| June 5
| @ Houston
| L 96–111
| Kevin McHale (33)
| Kevin McHale (8)
| Danny Ainge (5)
| The Summit16,016
| 3–2
|- align="center" bgcolor="#ccffcc"
| 6
| June 8
| Houston
| W 114–97
| Larry Bird (29)
| Larry Bird (11)
| Larry Bird (12)
| Boston Garden14,890
| 4–2
|-

Following the conclusion of the 1986 NBA Finals, a video documentary of the 1986 NBA season, known as Sweet Sixteen, was released. David Perry was the narrator after Dick Stockton had narrated the last three NBA season documentaries.

Roster

Award winners
 Larry Bird, Associated Press Athlete of the Year
 Larry Bird, NBA Most Valuable Player Award
 Larry Bird, NBA Finals Most Valuable Player Award
 Larry Bird, All-NBA First Team
 Kevin McHale, All-NBA Defensive First Team
 Dennis Johnson, All-NBA Defensive Second Team
 Bill Walton, NBA Sixth Man of the Year Award
 Larry Bird, NBA 3-Point Shootout champion
 Larry Bird, three-point field goal leader

References

 Celtics on Database Basketball
 Celtics on Basketball Reference
 

Boston Celtics seasons
NBA championship seasons
Boston Celtics
Eastern Conference (NBA) championship seasons
Boston Celtics
Boston Celtics
Celtics
Celtics